Lista variegata is a species of moth of the family Pyralidae. It was described by Frederic Moore in 1888, and is known from India (it was described from Darjeeling).

References

Moths described in 1888
Epipaschiinae